Shadows Evolve (also known as evolve.) is the debut studio album by Australian neo-psychedelia band The Morning After Girls, released in 2005.

Track listing

References 

2005 albums
The Morning After Girls albums